Charles Brinley (November 15, 1880 – February 17, 1946) was an American actor of the silent era. He appeared in 140 films between 1913 and 1939. He was born in Yuma, Arizona and died in Los Angeles, California.

Selected filmography

References

External links

1880 births
1946 deaths
Male actors from Arizona
American male film actors
American male silent film actors
Male Western (genre) film actors
20th-century American male actors